Mussaendeae is a tribe of flowering plants in the family Rubiaceae and contains about 221 species in 8 genera. Its representatives are found from tropical and southern Africa, the western Indian Ocean, to tropical and subtropical Asia and the Pacific region.

Genera 
Currently accepted names

 Aphaenandra Miq. (1 sp)
 Bremeria Razafim. & Alejandro (18 sp)
 Heinsia DC. (5 sp)
 Landiopsis Capuron ex Bosser (1 sp)
 Mussaenda L. (187 sp)
 Neomussaenda Tange (2 sp)
 Pseudomussaenda Wernham (6 sp)
 Schizomussaenda H.L.Li (1 sp)

Synonyms

 Asemanthia Ridl. = Mussaenda
 Belilla Adans. = Mussaenda
 Epitaberna K.Schum. = Heinsia
 Landia Comm. ex A.Juss. = Bremeria
 Menestoria DC. = Mussaenda
 Spallanzania DC. = Mussaenda

References

External links 
 
 
 Mussaendeae at uniprot.org

 
Ixoroideae tribes